Martin P. "Marty" Fletcher (born March 6, 1951) is an American retired college basketball coach. Coaching for over twenty seasons from the early 1980s to the 2004, Fletcher led three different Division I schools while winning two conference regular season and tournament championships while collecting over 250 total wins. During the 2003–04 season, Fletcher was the only coach in Division I or Division II to be the head coach for a school's men's and women's teams. That year, he took over the University of Colorado Colorado Springs' (UCCS) men's team for one season while also spending his third year in charge of the women's team.

He is a 1973 graduate of the University of Maryland.

Coaching career
Fletcher first became a head coach in 1982 for the Virginia Military Institute following the departure of his predecessor Charlie Schmaus. Schmaus had led the Keydets to a Sweet Sixteen appearance in 1977 and a 26–4 record, their best in school history. The team was led by future VMI Hall of Famer and NBA player Ron Carter. Despite the initial success, however, by the time Fletcher took over, the Keydets were coming off a 1–25 season and had only won five times in the past two years. In their first season under their new head coach, VMI continued to struggle with a 2–25 record, but showed significant improvement the following year and achieved a winning record by 1985 at 16–14. Fletcher then left the school the next season, leaving VMI with a .330 winning percentage.

Fletcher's most endured period of success came at the University of Southwestern Louisiana, now known as Louisiana. As the Ragin' Cajuns head coach for eleven years, he led the school to a regular season and tournament championship in 1992 in their inaugural Sun Belt Conference season, as well as another tournament title in 1994. Seven of Fletcher's eleven years at Louisiana produced winning seasons.

Fletcher then left for the Denver Pioneers, who were a Division II school at the time of his arrival. He assisted the program in its transition to Division I and the Sun Belt, but could not produce a winning season at Denver. He left the school following the conclusion of the 2000–01 season.

Head coaching record
Note: These are for his college men's teams only. His time as UCCS's women's coach is not included in these records.

References

1951 births
Living people
American men's basketball coaches
American women's basketball coaches
College men's basketball head coaches in the United States
Denver Pioneers men's basketball coaches
High school basketball coaches in Maryland
Louisiana Ragin' Cajuns men's basketball coaches
NC State Wolfpack men's basketball coaches
UCCS Mountain Lions men's basketball coaches
UCCS Mountain Lions women's basketball coaches
University of Maryland, College Park alumni
VMI Keydets basketball coaches